Michael S. K. Grant FBCS is a British businesperson and IT professional who has been Master of the Worshipful Company of Information Technologists and President of the BCS.

Michael Grant is the son of an RAF corporal. He attended The King's School, a cathedral school in Rochester, where he became head boy. His first job was directly from school at Heinz. He later worked for Redifon in the area of flight simulation.

Michael Grant has worked at director and vice-president level for a number of IT companies such as Commodore, Gateway, ICL, Lotus, Prime Computer, Wang, etc. He was Clerk of the Worshipful Company of Information Technologists from 2004 to 2010 and subsequently Master during 2012–13. Later for the year 2019–20, he was President of the BCS.

Grant holds an honorary degree as a Doctor of Technology for his work in the industry from Solent University, awarded in 2019. He is also an ceremonial pikeman for the Lord Mayor of London. He is an Associate Director of Harvey Nash.

See also
 List of presidents of the British Computer Society

References

External links
 
 

Year of birth missing (living people)
Living people
Place of birth missing (living people)
People educated at King's School, Rochester
Businesspeople in information technology
English businesspeople
International Computers Limited people
Presidents of the British Computer Society
People associated with Solent University